The English-only movement, also known as the Official English movement, is a political movement that advocates for the use of only the English language in official United States government operations through the establishment of English as the only official language in the United States. The United States has never had a legal policy proclaiming an official national language. However, at some times and places, there have been various moves to promote or require the use of English, such as in Native American boarding schools.

Support for the English-only movement began in 1907, under US President Theodore Roosevelt, and continues today as studies prove high percentage in approval ratings. Republican candidates have supported this movement during elections.

The English-only movement has received criticism and rejection within societies and educational systems. The American Civil Liberties Union (ACLU) has stated that English-only laws are inconsistent with both the First Amendment right to communicate with or petition the government, as well as free speech and the right to equality, because they bar government employees from providing non-English language assistance and services. Current law shows that the United States federal government does not specify an official language; however, each state has unique terms they abide by.

Early efforts
Disputes between citizens and immigrants over English have been waged since the 1750s, when street signs were changed in Pennsylvania to include both English and German languages to accommodate the many German immigrants. The German-English debate continued until World War I when international hostility resulted in the rejection of all things German, including the prohibition of the German language and German-language materials, particularly books.

In 1803, as a result of the Louisiana Purchase, the United States acquired French-speaking populations in Louisiana. As a condition to admittance to the Union, Louisiana included in its constitution a provision, which was later repealed, that required all official documents be published in the language "in which the Constitution of the United States is written". Today, Louisiana has no law stating that English is the official language of the State.

After the Mexican–American War (1846–1848), the United States acquired about 75,000 Spanish speakers in addition to several indigenous language-speaking populations.

An 1847 law authorized Anglo-French instruction in public schools in Louisiana. In 1849, the California constitution recognized Spanish language rights. French language rights were abolished after the American Civil War. In 1868, the Indian Peace Commission recommended English-only schooling for the Native Americans. In 1878–79, the California constitution was rewritten to state that "[a]ll laws of the State of California, and all official writings, and the executive, legislative, and judicial proceedings shall be conducted, preserved, and published in no other than the English language."

In the late 1880s, Wisconsin and Illinois passed English-only instruction laws for both public and parochial schools.

In 1896, under the Republic of Hawaii government, English became the primary medium of public schooling for Hawaiian children. After the Spanish–American War, English was declared "the official language of the school room" in Puerto Rico. In the same way, English was declared the official language in the Philippines, after the Philippine–American War.

In 1907, US President Theodore Roosevelt wrote, "We have room for but one language in this country, and that is the English language, for we intend to see that the crucible turns our people out as Americans, of American nationality, and not as dwellers in a polyglot boarding house."

During World War I, there was a widespread campaign against the use of the German language in the US; this included removing books in the German language from libraries. (A related action took place in South Australia as well with the Nomenclature Act of 1917. The legislation renamed 69 towns, suburbs, or areas that had German names.)

In 1923, a bill drafted by Congressman Washington J. McCormick became the first proposed legislation regarding the United States' national language that would have made "American" the national language in order to differentiate the United States's language from that of England. This bill did not pass in Congress despite significant support—especially from Irish immigrants who were resentful of British influence.

Support
U.S. English is an organization that advocates for Official English, founded in the 1980s by former United States Senator S. I. Hayakawa and John Tanton. ProEnglish is another group founded by Tanton that advocates Official English.

In 2018, a Rasmussen poll found that 81% of American adults thought that English should be the official language of the United States, while 12% did not.

In 2021, a Rasmussen poll found that 73% of Americans thought that English should be the official language, only 18% disagreed.

Modern
In 1980, Miami-Dade County, Florida voters approved an "anti-bilingual ordinance". However, this was repealed by the county commission in 1993, after "racially orientated redistricting" led to a change in government.

In 1981, English was declared the official language in the commonwealth of Virginia.

In 1983, John Tanton and U.S. Senator S. I. Hayakawa founded a political lobbying organization, U.S. English. (Tanton was a former head of the Sierra Club's population committee and of Zero Population Growth, and founder of the Federation for American Immigration Reform (FAIR), an immigration reductionist group.) In 1986, Tanton wrote a memo containing remarks about Hispanics claimed by critics to be  derogatory, which appeared in the Arizona Republic newspaper, leading to the resignations from U.S. English board member Walter Cronkite and executive director Linda Chavez; Tanton would also sever his ties to the organization as a result. That same year, 1986, Larry Pratt founded English First, while Lou Zaeske, an engineer from Bryan, Texas, established the American Ethnic Coalition. Mauro Mujica, a Chilean immigrant, was later named Chairman and CEO in 1993.

In 1994, John Tanton and other former U.S. English associates founded ProEnglish specifically to defend Arizona's English-only law. ProEnglish rejects the term "English-only movement" and asks its supporters to refer to the movement instead as "Official English".

The U.S. Senate voted on two separate changes to an immigration bill in May 2006. The amended bill recognized English as a "common and unifying language" and gave contradictory instructions to government agencies on their obligations for non-English publications.

In what was essentially a replay of the 2006 actions, on June 6, 2007 the US Senate again voted on two separate amendments to a subsequent immigration reform bill that closely resembled the amendments to the 2006 Senate bill. Ultimately, neither the 2006 nor 2007 immigration reform bill has become law.

On January 22, 2009, voters in Nashville, Tennessee rejected a proposal under a referendum election to make "Nashville the largest city in the United States to prohibit the government from using languages other than English, with exceptions allowed for issues of health and safety." The initiative failed by a vote of 57% to 43%.

In March 2012, Republican presidential candidate Rick Santorum was criticized by some Republican delegates from Puerto Rico when he publicly took the position that Puerto Rico, a Spanish-speaking territory, should be required to make English its primary language as a condition of statehood.

In 2015 during a debate, Republican presidential candidate Donald Trump said, "This is a country where we speak English, not Spanish."

On February 6, 2019, the 116th Congress introduced a bill in House establishing English as the official language of the United States. The House of Representatives named it the English Language Unity Act of 2019. Within this bill, there is a framework for implementation. They strive to enforce the English as the only language by testing it during the naturalization process. This bill has yet to be passed.

Criticism
The modern English-only movement has met with rejection from the Linguistic Society of America, which passed a resolution in 1986–87 opposing "'English only' measures on the grounds that they are based on misconceptions about the role of a common language in establishing political unity, and that they are inconsistent with basic American traditions of linguistic tolerance."

Linguist Geoffrey Pullum, in an essay entitled "Here come the linguistic fascists", charges English First with "hatred and suspicion of aliens and immigrants" and points out that English is far from under threat in the United States, saying "making English the official language of the United States of America is about as urgently called for as making hotdogs the official food at baseball games." Rachele Lawton, applying critical discourse analysis, argues that English-only's rhetoric suggests that the "real motivation is discrimination and disenfranchisement."

The American Civil Liberties Union (ACLU) has stated that English-only laws are inconsistent with both the First Amendment right to communicate with or petition the government, as well as free speech and the right to equality, because they bar government employees from providing non-English language assistance and services. On August 11, 2000, President Bill Clinton signed Executive Order 13166, "Improving Access to Services for Persons with Limited English Proficiency." The Executive Order requires Federal agencies to examine the services they provide, identify any need for services to those with limited English proficiency (LEP), and develop and implement a system to provide those services so LEP persons can have meaningful access to them.

While the judicial system has noted that state English-only laws are largely symbolic and non-prohibitive, supervisors and managers often interpret them to mean English is the mandatory language of daily life. In one instance, an elementary school bus driver prohibited students from speaking Spanish on their way to school after Colorado passed its legislation. In 2004 in Scottsdale, a teacher claimed to be enforcing English immersion policies when she allegedly slapped students for speaking Spanish in class. In 2005 in Kansas City, a student was suspended for speaking Spanish in the school hallways. The written discipline referral explaining the decision of the school to suspend the student for one and a half days, noted: "This is not the first time we have [asked] Zach and others to not speak Spanish at school."

One study both of laws requiring English as the language of instruction and compulsory schooling laws during the Americanization period (1910–1930) found that the policies moderately increased the literacy of some foreign-born children but had no impact on immigrants' eventual labor market outcomes or measures of social integration. The authors concluded that the "very moderate impacts" of the laws were probably because foreign languages were declining naturally, without the help of English-only laws.

Current law

The United States federal government does not specify an official language; however, all official documents in the U.S. are written in English, though some are also published in other languages.

See also

Bilingual education
Council for the Development of French in Louisiana
English language learning and teaching
English Language Unity Act
Languages in the United States
List of countries where English is an official language
Official language
Spanish in the United States
English-medium education
English Plus

References

Further reading
 Lynch, William. "A Nation Established by Immigrants Sanctions Employers for Requiring English to be Spoken at Work: English-Only Work Rules and National Origin Discrimination," 16 Temple Political and Civil Rights Law Review 65 (2006).
 Olson, Wendy. "The Shame of Spanish: Cultural Bias in English First Legislation," Chicano-Latino Law Review 11 (1991).

External links
U.S. English (advocates for Official English)
Anatomy of the English-Only Movement, by James Crawford
Institute for Language and Education Policy
Lingo Jingo: English Only and the New Nativism, by Geoffrey Nunberg
English-Only Movement: Its Consequences on the Education of Language Minority Children
Language Legislation in the U.S.A.
Statements and legal actions against English-only law by the American Civil Liberties Union
English as the Official Language of the United States: Legal background and Analysis of Legislation in the 110th Congress
Linguistic Society of American Statement on Language Rights

 
 
Language legislation
Politics of the United States by issue
Conservatism in the United States
Right-wing politics in the United States